The 2019 Alsco 300 is a NASCAR Xfinity Series race held on July 12, 2019, at Kentucky Speedway in Sparta, Kentucky. Contested over 200 laps on the  tri-oval speedway, it was the 17th race of the 2019 NASCAR Xfinity Series season.

Background

Track

The track is a  tri-oval speedway in Sparta, Kentucky, which has hosted ARCA, NASCAR and Indy Racing League racing annually since it opened in 2000. The track is currently owned and operated by Speedway Motorsports. The speedway has a grandstand capacity of 69,000.

Entry list

Practice

First practice

Final practice

Qualifying

Qualifying results

Race

Summary
Austin Cindric started on pole. Christopher Bell overtook him and remained in the lead. Tyler Reddick got loose next to Brandon Jones, but managed to save it. The first caution occurred after Jairo Avila Jr. slammed the wall hard. Bell retook the lead after the caution and won Stage 1.

Justin Haley exited pit road first after only taking two tires as opposed to four. He was unable to hold the lead and was passed by Jones. Cindric got loose next to Haley, turning the rear of Cindric's car into the wall and causing damage to Haley's car. Bell took the lead from Jones until Ronnie Bassett Jr. spun out and brought out the next caution. Bell charged to the front and won Stage 2.

Jones was leading the race with half of the race completed when his engine blew, eliminating him from the race and giving the lead to Chase Briscoe. Later, Cole Custer and Bell passed Briscoe and remained in their positions. Custer continued his dominating lead, lapping the majority of the field. He won the race with a one second lead over Bell. Custer's strong run resulted in only five cars finishing on the lead lap.

Stage Results

Stage One
Laps: 45

Stage Two
Laps: 45

Final Stage Results

Stage Three
Laps: 110

References

NASCAR races at Kentucky Speedway
2019 in sports in Kentucky
Alsco 300
2019 NASCAR Xfinity Series